William Langford is a former Australian rules footballer who played for the Hawthorn Football Club in the Australian Football League (AFL). Langford is the son of Hawthorn Team of the Century backman Chris Langford, who is currently a member of the AFL Commission.

AFL career

Rookie
Langford was recruited to the Hawks as a part of their NSW Scholarship programme in the 2011 Rookie draft. Langford suffered  chronic fatigue syndrome in his first year at the Hawks in 2011. After an impressive season in Box Hill in defence in 2012, he was shifted into the midfield and impressing early in the 2013 season, he was elevated to the senior list along with John Ceglar after Hawks players Ryan Schoenmakers and Matt Suckling were placed on the club's long term injury list. and played one senior game against the Western Bulldogs in round 17 at Launceston's Aurora Stadium. Langford continued his solid form with Box Hill throughout the 2013 season, culminating in playing in the club's second VFL Premiership against Geelong.

Promotion to senior list

He was promoted to the main player list for 2014. Hawthorn used pick 71 in the 2013 AFL Draft.
In 2014 Langford started the season in the seniors showing at times the VFL form from the previous year. He lost his spot mid year and returned to Box Hill and told to work on several parts of his game. Within a month he had returned the seniors and became one of Hawthorn's best reliable midfielders after shutting out  captain Joel Selwood in a round 22 clash and a best on ground performance in the Preliminary Final shutting down  captain Travis Boak and a dominating display in the 2014 AFL Grand Final where he kicked 3 goals and collected 21 disposals. The Hawks won by 63 points and he was listed as one of the best players.

Langford enjoyed career-high kicking and marking figures in 2017 and his best since 2014 when he was the star of the finals series. He was one of the few bright lights early in the season when the Hawks were being trounced. His goalkicking became erratic missing what should have been easy set shots put his teammates under pressure. He played only six senior games in 2018, suffering a season ending hamstring injury.

On 30 October 2018, Langford was delisted by Hawthorn and subsequently retired.

Statistics

|- style=background:#EAEAEA
| 2011 ||  || 48
| 0 || — || — || — || — || — || — || — || — || — || — || — || — || — || — || —
|-
| 2012 ||  || 48
| 0 || — || — || — || — || — || — || — || — || — || — || — || — || — || — || —
|- style=background:#EAEAEA
| 2013 ||  || 29
| 1 || 0 || 1 || 3 || 1 || 4 || 1 || 3 || 0.0 || 1.0 || 3.0 || 1.0 || 4.0 || 1.0 || 3.0 || 0
|-
| bgcolor=F0E68C | 2014# ||  || 29
| 19 || 9 || 8 || 166 || 199 || 365 || 35 || 90 || 0.5 || 0.4 || 8.7 || 10.5 || 19.2 || 1.8 || 4.7 || 1
|- style=background:#EAEAEA
| 2015 ||  || 29
| 13 || 4 || 7 || 125 || 126 || 251 || 26 || 56 || 0.3 || 0.5 || 9.6 || 9.7 || 19.3 || 2.0 || 4.3 || 0
|-
| 2016 ||  || 29
| 13 || 4 || 4 || 118 || 106 || 224 || 31 || 65 || 0.3 || 0.3 || 9.1 || 8.2 || 17.2 || 8.2 || 5.0 || 0
|- style=background:#EAEAEA
| 2017 ||  || 29
| 20 || 7 || 15 || 196 || 166 || 362 || 65 || 70 || 0.4 || 0.8 || 9.8 || 8.3 || 18.1 || 3.3 || 3.5 || 0
|-
| 2018 ||  || 29
| 6 || 0 || 1 || 36 || 31 || 67 || 12 || 11 || 0.0 || 0.2 || 6.0 || 5.2 || 11.2 || 2.0 || 1.8 || 0
|- class="sortbottom"
! colspan=3| Career
! 72 !! 24 !! 36 !! 644 !! 629 !! 1273 !! 170 !! 295 !! 0.3 !! 0.5 !! 8.9 !! 8.7 !! 17.7 !! 2.4 !! 4.1 !! 1
|}

Honours and achievements
Team
 AFL premiership player: 2014
 Minor premiership: 2013
 VFL premiership player: 2013
 Minor premiership: 2015

Family
He is the son of Hawthorn Team of the Century backman Chris Langford, who represented the club in 303 games, including 4 premierships, and is currently a member of the AFL Commission. Will's younger brother, Lachlan Langford was rookied by the Hawks in the 2015 AFL rookie draft. It's the first time brothers have been on the  list since Shane and Justin Crawford in 1998. 
With Will's premiership in 2014, the Langfords became the second father/son premiership players at the club after Peter and Paul Hudson in 1971 and 1991 respectively.

His Uncle (Tom Langford) was a prominent VFL player, mainly with Port Melbourne, from 2006 - 2017, before becoming a Development Coach with Richmond.

References

External links

Living people
1992 births
Australian rules footballers from New South Wales
Box Hill Football Club players
Hawthorn Football Club players
Hawthorn Football Club Premiership players
UNSW-Eastern Suburbs Bulldogs players
People educated at Cranbrook School, Sydney
One-time VFL/AFL Premiership players